Gregorio María Aguirre y García (12 March 1835 – 10 October 1913) was a Cardinal of the Roman Catholic Church and Archbishop of Toledo and Primate of Spain.

Biography

Early life and education
Gregorio María Aguirre y García was born in La Pola de Gordón, León Province. He was educated at the Seminary of Leon, and the Colegio de Pastrana.

Priesthood

He was ordained and served as a faculty member and rector of several theological colleges of his order in Spain and the Philippines. He was lecturer of philosophy from 1860 until 1863; and theology from 1863 to 1879. He was rector of the schools of Consuegra, 1867–1870; Pastrana, 1870–1876; Almagro, 1878; and Puebla de Montalbán, 1881.

Episcopate
He was appointed as bishop of Lugo on 27 March 1885 by Pope Leo XIII. He served as Senator of the Spanish kingdom from 1893 until 1895, and again from 1902 until his death. He was promoted to the metropolitan see of Burgos on 21 May 1894.  From 1909 until his death, he was Archbishop of Toledo.

Cardinalate
He was created cardinal priest of San Giovanni a Porta Latina in the consistory of 15 April 1907 by Pope Pius X. He was transferred to the primatial see of Toledo on 29 April 1909. He died on 10 October 1913.

References

1835 births
1913 deaths
People from Montaña Occidental
20th-century Spanish cardinals
Archbishops of Toledo
Archbishops of Burgos
19th-century Roman Catholic bishops in Spain
20th-century Roman Catholic archbishops in Spain
Cardinals created by Pope Pius X